Górno may refer to the following places:
Górno, Lublin Voivodeship (east Poland)
Górno, Subcarpathian Voivodeship (south-east Poland)
Górno, Świętokrzyskie Voivodeship (south-central Poland)